Rue de la Pompe is a station on line 9 of the Paris Métro, named after the Rue de la Pompe.  The station opened on 8 November 1922 with the opening of the first section of the line from Trocadéro to Exelmans.

This Passy street is mentioned in the archives of 1730 as a way of skirting the walls of the Château de la Muette.  It led to one of the gates in the wall surrounding the Bois de Boulogne.  It was called the old path, but was transformed at the end of the 18th century into a street and was named after the pump (French: pompe) that supplied water to the Château de la Muette.

Nearby are the Lycée Janson de Sailly (a prestigious high school) and the town hall of the 16th arrondissement.

Station layout

References

Paris Métro stations in the 16th arrondissement of Paris
Railway stations in France opened in 1922